Victoria Mixon is an American independent fiction editor and writer. She was co-author of the first published book on introducing children to the Internet, and has written four books on the craft of writing fiction.

Bibliography

Nonfiction

References

External links

Living people
California Polytechnic State University alumni
Editing
Year of birth missing (living people)